Schoenoplectus tabernaemontani (syn. Scirpus validus) is a species of flowering plant in the sedge family known by the common names softstem bulrush, grey club-rush, and great bulrush. It can be found throughout much of the world; it has been reported from every state in the United States (including Hawaii), and from every province and territory in Canada except Nunavut. It grows in moist and wet habitat, and sometimes in shallow water.

Schoenoplectus tabernaemontani is quite variable in appearance, thus explaining the long list of synonyms that have been created over the years. It is a perennial herb producing dense stands of many narrow erect stems reaching 1–3 m (33–100 inches) in height. It grows from a long rhizome system. The leaves are mostly basal and have wide sheaths around the stems. The inflorescence is generally a panicle of spikelets on long, thin branches which spread, arch, or droop. The spikelets vary in color. There is usually a long, stiff bract alongside each spikelet or cluster of spikelets.

A cultivar of this species with bright horizontal white or yellowish stripes, S. tabernaemontani 'Zebrinus', is sold as an ornamental plant for water gardens and landscaping. Solid white and yellow cultivars are also available.

Uses
The new shoots and young roots may be eaten raw or cooked. The older roots can be made into flour.

In Hawaii - known as ‘aka‘akai, kaluhā, nānaku - its stems are made into floor mats. In New Zealand, known as kāpūngāwhā, it is a source of weaving fabric.

References

External links
Jepson Manual Treatment
Washington Burke Museum
Native Plants Hawaii, Schoenoplectus tabernaemontani

tabernaemontani
Flora of North America
Plants described in 1805
Root vegetables